Charly (Engl) is a commune in the Cher department in the Centre-Val de Loire region of France.

Geography
Ancient quarries here provided the stone for the cathedral of Bourges.

The river Airain forms most of the commune's northwestern boundary.

Population

Sights
 The church of Notre-Dame, dating from the twelfth century.
 Some ancient houses.
 Remains of a Benedictine abbey.
 Two watermills

See also
Communes of the Cher department

References

Communes of Cher (department)